Club de Fútbol Estudiantes de Atlacomulco is a Mexican football club that plays in the Liga TDP. The club is based in Atlacomulco, State of Mexico and was founded in 1991. In 2019 the team was relocated from Atlacomulco to El Oro, in 2022 they returned to Atlacomulco.

See also
Football in Mexico
Tercera División de México

External links
Tercera Divicion

References 

Association football clubs established in 1991
Football clubs in the State of Mexico
1991 establishments in Mexico